Luang, also known as  (Letri Lgona), is an Austronesian language spoken in the Leti Islands and the Babar Islands in Maluku, Indonesia. It is closely related to the neighboring Leti language, with 89% shared basic vocabulary.

Phonology

Consonants 

 Palatalization and labialization  among sounds may occur when preceding glide sounds .

  can be heard as  when preceding . 

  can be heard as  when preceding a consonant. It can be heard as  when between two high vowels, and can also be heard freely as  when between a non-high vowel and a high vowel. 

Vowels 

 An epenthetical schwa  can be heard in between homorganic consonants.

  can be heard as  word-medially in closed syllables, and in stressed and pre-stressed syllables.

  can be heard as  word-finally and in both stressed and post-stressed syllables.

References

External links
Luang Bible

Timor–Babar languages
Languages of Indonesia